Khiali Shahpur is a town in Gujranwala in Punjab, Pakistan.

History
Khiali and Shahpur were originally two separate villages about two miles away from Gujranwala district courts. Both towns were about one acre away from the single lane Sheikhupura road.
Khiali was a very old village. The Sansi clan is Hindu by origin and according to historians were the people living in ancient Gujranwala. There were few Sansi villages, which are all now part of greater Gujranwala. As the majority of the Sansis fled to India, a number of families from India migrated here. Another famous and old rooted family of khiali is the Quraishi Hashmi family. This family is widely known for religious and educational background.A number of mosques, schools and welfare hospitals are patronised by the Hashmi Quraishi family of khiali.

Environmental conditions 
It is mostly an industrial area, thus forced to pollute the environment and as it is comparatively more developed, the people take less precautionary measures to prevent most of the pollution. This leads to Land Constraint.

Location 
The town is located between a bus stand connecting with the Grand Trunk Road and the Khiali Bypass. West of the Khiali Bypass is a road which leads to the Grand Trunk Road and also to Wapda Town, Gujranwala.

References

Cities and towns in Gujranwala District
Union councils of Wazirabad Tehsil